Iryna Popova is a Ukrainian cross-country mountain biker  She is 2016 European champion in women's cross-country eliminator race.

References

Cross-country mountain bikers
Ukrainian female cyclists
1991 births
People from Horlivka
Living people
Olympic cyclists of Ukraine
Cyclists at the 2016 Summer Olympics
Sportspeople from Donetsk Oblast
21st-century Ukrainian women